Jos van Son (31 May 1893 – 14 July 1956) was a Dutch footballer. He played in one match for the Netherlands national football team in 1923.

References

External links
 

1893 births
1956 deaths
Dutch footballers
Netherlands international footballers
Place of birth missing
Association footballers not categorized by position